Johan Severin Nilsson (14 January 1846 – 24 November 1918) was a Swedish painter and photographer.

Biography
Nilsson was born in Asige Parish, Halland. His father was a blacksmith. In 1865, at the age of eighteen, he enrolled as a student at the Royal Swedish Academy of Arts in Stockholm; graduating in 1871. While there, he and Ernst Josephson became good friends. In 1873, they went to Paris together. On the way, they paid a visit to the painter, Bengt Nordenberg in Düsseldorf and were influenced by the Düsseldorf School.

In Paris, he studied under Léon Bonnat for three years. He also learned some photography. When he returned home, he obtained some photographic equipment and took his first pictures in Halland in 1875. He often worked "in parallel", using both camera and brush. He was also one of the first Swedish documentary photographers. Inspired by Arthur Hazelius, he made photographic studies of public life, especially in the village where he was born.
Most of his pictures of people appear, however, to have been staged.

His paintings were mostly portraits, landscapes and genre scenes. A prolific artist, he participated in numerous exhibitions and left behind a large and diverse body of work. He died in Stockholm in 1918.

Paintings and photographs

References

External links

Biography @ the Svenskt Biografiskt Lexikon
More works by Nilsson @ ArtNet

1846 births
1918 deaths
19th-century Swedish painters
Swedish male painters
20th-century Swedish painters
19th-century Swedish photographers
Documentary photographers
19th-century Swedish male artists
20th-century Swedish male artists